Finland was represented by Pihasoittajat, with the song "Old Man Fiddle", at the 1975 Eurovision Song Contest, which took place on 22 March in Stockholm.

Before Eurovision
The Finnish national selection consisted of four semi finals and a final. It was the first year the Finnish selection shows were broadcast in colour.

Semi finals
Four songs were performed in each semi final and a professional jury chose two songs from each semi final to qualify for the final. After the semi finals, a wildcard was also chosen for the final.

First semi final

Second semi final

Third semi final

Fourth semi final

Final
The final took place on February 8 at the YLE TV Studios in Helsinki. It was hosted by Apeli Halinen. The winner was chosen by regional juries.

The winning song "Viulu-ukko" was performed in Finnish in the national selection shows but it was translated into English for the international Song Contest as "Old Man Fiddle".

At Eurovision
On the night of the final Pihasoittajat performed 15th in the running order, following Monaco and preceding Portugal. The Finnish entry was conducted by Ossi Runne. At the close of voting, Finland picked up 74 points and placed 7th of the 19 entries.

Among the members of the Finnish jury were Tero Lehto, Merja Nyström, Ari Montonen and Hilkka Sokura.

Voting

Sources
Viisukuppila- Muistathan: Suomen karsinnat 1975 
Finnish national final 1975 on natfinals

External links
Full national final  

1975
Countries in the Eurovision Song Contest 1975
Eurovision